, also known as , is a Japanese manga series written and illustrated by Junji Ito. It was serialized in Nemuki+ from August 2018 to August 2019 and published in a single volume in November 2019.

While thinking of ideas for the book, Ito eventually settled on making a more character-driven narrative, since he had not tried doing one much before. While working on the book, Ito did not know how the story would end, instead opting to piece together the story while following the characters.

Upon its international releases, the book has been successful, both critically and commercially. Many critics offered praise for the artwork and the story, often comparing it to works of H. P. Lovecraft. On the commercial end, the book has ranked well in multiple best seller lists and was nominated for an award at the Angoulême International Comics Festival.

Synopsis
A woman walks alone at the foot of Mount Sengoku. A man appears, saying he’s been waiting for her, and invites her to a nearby village. Surprisingly, the village is covered in hair-like volcanic glass fibers, and all of it shines a bright gold. At night, when the villagers perform their custom of gazing up at the starry sky, countless unidentified flying objects come raining down on them—the opening act for the terror is about to occur.

Development
Before starting serialization, Junji Ito had a discussion with his editor over the main theme of the story. They eventually settled on making a more character-driven narrative, since it was something that Ito had not tried much in the past. Upon starting the series, Ito did not have a specific idea for its ending, often just piecing the story together as it went, following along with the characters. Ito would often find this approach resulting in unexpected ideas helping to drive the story forward.

Publication
Written and illustrated by Junji Ito, the series began serialization in Nemuki+ on August 10, 2018. The series completed its serialization on August 10, 2019. The individual chapters were collected into a single tankōbon volume, which was released by Asahi Sonorama on November 7, 2019.

In October 2020, Viz Media announced they licensed the series for English publication. They released the volume on August 17, 2021.

Reception

Critical response
Briana Lawrence from The Mary Sue praised the book for its premise and for having all the small details matter in the end. Evan Mullicane from Screen Rant also offered it praise, specifically stating that the book has a compelling mystery in addition to horror, as well as great artwork. Tom Speelman from Polygon also offered praise for the artwork, while favorably comparing the story to works by American horror author H. P. Lovecraft. Danica Davidson from Otaku USA also praised the artwork, particularly in the facial expressions of the characters. However, Lynzee Loveridge from Anime News Network was more critical. She praised the book's connection to Japanese history, while criticizing the book for what she felt were half-baked plot ideas and minimal scares. Ian Wolf from Anime UK News was more mixed, saying that while Sensor was not as good as other works by Ito, it still stood out from the crowd.

Commercial
The book ranked fifth on The NPD Group's Monthly BookScan in August 2021. In the following month, the book ranked twelfth on the same list. In ICv2s top graphic novel list, the book ranked first in the units sold category and third in the dollars earned category. In the following month, the book ranked sixth in both categories. The book also ranked sixth on The New York Times Best Seller list for manga and graphic books in September 2021.

At the Angoulême International Comics Festival, the series was nominated for best comic in 2021.

References

External links
 

Asahi Sonorama manga
Horror anime and manga
Science fiction anime and manga
Shōjo manga
Viz Media manga